Trosa is a locality and the seat of Trosa Municipality, Södermanland County, Sweden with 5,027 inhabitants in 2010 (town) and 11,417 in 2010 (municipality). The town is colloquially nicknamed Världens ände ("The world's end", specifically the rear end, as "Trosa" is coincidentally also Swedish for "panty").

The municipality of Trosa consists of the three towns Trosa, Västerljung and Vagnhärad. Despite its small size, Trosa states its place in Sweden. It is the second fastest growing town in Sweden (2,9%/year 2008) and is ranked as having the 3rd best business climate in Sweden (2011).

History 

Trosa was known as a town in the 14th century. In the 15th century it was an important site for trade, and received its city privileges in 1454 by King Charles VIII of Sweden (a.k.a. Karl Knutsson Bonde). Due to post-glacial rebound, the city center was moved in the early 17th century, to its present location by the estuary of the Trosa River. The city gained its valour at the new location from King Karl IX, 19 April 1610.

The city was burnt down and plundered by Russians in 1719 during the Russian Pillage of 1719-1721 and was repeatedly attacked during the Great Northern War, but the local church and poor-house was spared at every occasion. Both these buildings are now on display in the center of Trosa and serves as a memory from those hard times.

The economic base of the city was as earlier merchantmen and fishery. When the baltic fishery during the 1870s diminished in economic terms, the city opted for tourism as a business for the small coastal city.

Present 

Today Trosa is one of the top four wealthiest communities in Sweden (32% of the population earns more than 1,5 million SEK a year). Many famous people have summerhouses in or close to Trosa, for example the well-known chef, hunter and actor Per Morberg as well as Tommy Körberg, the Swedish Royal Family, Mikael Persbrandt, ABBAs Benny Andersson and Björn Ulvaeus. The founder of Camfil Farr, Gösta Larsson, lived in Trosa all of his life and at the moment the Larsson-Markman family runs the company.

The general number of people living in Trosa goes up by 131% during the summer months of June–August because of the high ratio of summer residences. Trosa brings in a large number of tourists each year and the Board of Tourism in Södermanland estimates that a little less than 250,000 people from all over the world pass through the town each year.

During 2010 Trosa celebrated 400 years as a town at its present location under the motto "Future since 1610".

The metalcore band Adept (band) is from the town.

Education 
Within Trosa locality there are four elementary schools (grades 1-6), two junior high schools (grades 7-9). Right now there are no plans to build or house a high school or university/college within the municipality.

References

Populated places in Södermanland County
Populated places in Trosa Municipality
Municipal seats of Södermanland County
Swedish municipal seats
Coastal cities and towns in Sweden